Sea bass is a common name of various species of fishes.

Sea bass or seabass may also refer to:

Nickname
 Chris Bassitt (born 1989), pitcher for the Oakland Athletics
 Carlos Beltrán (born 1977), outfielder for the St. Louis Cardinals
 Sébastien Bourdais (born 1979), French Formula One driver and four-time Champ Car series winner
 Sébastien Chabal (born 1977), French international rugby player
 Sebastian Janikowski (born 1978), Oakland Raiders kicker
 Sebastian Stan (born 1982), Romanian-American actor
 Sebastian Vollmer (born 1984), New England Patriots tackle

Other uses
 Seabass (band), Australian  band who won the 2020 APRA AMCOS Emily Burrows Award
 , two ships
 Sea Bass, a ferry operated by The Port Service, Yokohama, Japan
 Sea Bass, a character in the film Dumb and Dumber and other films, played by Cam Neely
 SeaBASS (SeaWiFS Bio-optical Archive and Storage System), an oceanography data archive

See also
 Bard Bleimor, the bardic name of Yann-Ber Kalloc'h ("bleimor" means "sea bass" in Breton) 
 Bass (disambiguation)

Lists of people by nickname